The 2013 Detroit Thunder season was the first season for the Continental Indoor Football League (CIFL) franchise.

On November 1, 2012, the Thunder was officially announced as the CIFL's eleventh team for the 2013 season.  The team is owned by David and Cynthia Kinsman, who also own the Port Huron Patriots in the same league. In addition, the Michigan Cup was announces as the trophy the Thunder, Patriots, and Saginaw Sting would compete for during the 2013 season. On November 9, 2012, David Kinsman announced the Thunder would be playing their home games at the Taylor Sportsplex in Taylor, Michigan for the 2013 season, with the hopes to move to a larger venue in 2014.

Roster

Schedule

Regular season

Standings

Coaching staff

References

2013 Continental Indoor Football League season
Detroit Thunder
Detroit Thunder